Joaquim Manuel Aguiar Serafim (born 5 April 1967), known as Quim, is a Portuguese retired football central defender and manager.

Club career
Born in Beja, Alentejo, Quim spent his entire professional career with Vitória FC, appearing in 301 Primeira Liga games for the club over exactly ten seasons. He made his debut in the competition on 23 August 1987, playing the full 90 minutes in a 3–0 home win against Académica de Coimbra.

Quim retired at the end of the 2000–01 campaign at the age of 34, after contributing 13 appearances to help the Sado River side to return to the top division after a third-place finish. He acted as their caretaker manager early into 2009–10, winning one match and losing two.

See also
List of one-club men

References

External links

1967 births
Living people
People from Beja, Portugal
Sportspeople from Beja District
Portuguese footballers
Association football defenders
Primeira Liga players
Liga Portugal 2 players
C.D. Beja players
Vitória F.C. players
Portugal under-21 international footballers
Portuguese football managers
Primeira Liga managers
Vitória F.C. managers
C.D. Pinhalnovense managers